Dambarawa is a village in Sri Lanka. It is located within Central Province. Its name comes from ancient times as there were many Damba trees there. There is a small beautiful lake.

You can visit this village from Kandy 9 km. Another Dambarawa  village  located near Mahiyangana, which is a few miles away.

External links

Populated places in Central Province, Sri Lanka